Independence is an unincorporated community on Independence Mountain in Clay County, West Virginia, United States. It is located along West Virginia Route 16.

References

Unincorporated communities in Clay County, West Virginia
Unincorporated communities in West Virginia
Charleston, West Virginia metropolitan area